The Saga Age is the period in Icelandic history during which the majority of the sagas of Icelanders are set. It runs from the settlement of Iceland in 870 until about 1056 when the first bishop in Iceland founded a church at Skálaholt.

Bibliography 

Sagas of Icelanders